Do Ustad may refer to:
 Do Ustad (1982 film), a Bollywood film
 Do Ustad (1959 film), an Indian Hindi-language crime thriller film